Gruhn is a surname of notable people, including:

 George Gruhn, American writer, businessman and ophiophilist, specialized on vintage guitars 
 Gruhn Guitars, a musical instrument shop in Nashville, Tennessee
 Josephine Gruhn (1927–2015), American politician
 Ryan Gruhn (born 1982), American Martial Artist and MMA coach
 Wilfried Gruhn (born 1939), German violinist, musicologist, music educator and emeritus professor

Surnames
Surnames from nicknames
German toponymic surnames